Les Brillant was a French Canadian comedy television series that aired on TVA for three seasons between 1979 and 1982. A total of 101 episodes aired. It was broadcast as reruns during summertime throughout the 80's and is now regularly scheduled on the Prise 2 digital TV network.

External links

Les Brillant at Prise 2. Retrieved on 2009-01-15.

TVA (Canadian TV network) original programming
1979 Canadian television series debuts
1982 Canadian television series endings
Television shows set in Quebec
1970s Canadian sitcoms
1980s Canadian sitcoms